The Ariane de Rothschild art prize, dedicated to contemporary art, was established in 2003.  
The exhibition is held in Lisbon or Brussels.  
The award focuses on painting, but with works based on traditional forms of painting, the competition accepts works whose theme, technique or genre may include photography, sculpture and video.  
A jury selected the artists based on the originality of their works, their artistic merit and other criteria deemed relevant by the jury.  
The price is different from other competitions in that it is a non-monetary prize in the form of an all expenses paid 6 months artists-in-resident scholarship to the Slade School of Fine Arts in London.

Winners
 
 2008
 First prize: Mekhitar Garabedian
 Nominated artists: Stephan Balleux, Charlotte Baudry, Jean-Baptiste Bernadet, Sofia Boubolis, Mekhitar Garabedian, Adam Leech, Jean-Luc Moerman, David Neirings, Benoit Platéus, Fabrice Samyn, Ante Timmermans, Leon Vranken, Freek Wambacq
 2007
 Special Distinction: Tiago Margaça, Sem Título (Untitled)
 First prize: Susana Mendes Silva, Phantasia
 Second prize: José Marques Baptista, Sem Título (Untitled)
 Third Prize: David Rosado, Urban Talk in a Fundamental Relation
 2005
 First prize: Manuel Caeiro, The Last Room # 2
 Second Prize: Paula Sousa Cardoso, Everyday Lifestyle, Everyday Life Still
 Third prize: Carla Cabanas, Lagoa
 Fourth Prize: Ricardo Frutuoso, Os eternos fitavam-lhe os bosques imensos (The immortal eyes on huge wooden)
 Fifth Prize (tie): Pedro Barateiro, Monument (Monument)
 Fifth Prize (tie): Jorge Nesbitt, Sem Título (Untitled)
 2003
 First prize (tie): Bárbara Assis Pacheco, Sem Título (Untitled)
 First prize (tie): ex aequo: António José Almeida Pereira, Looks Up When hear a plane pass by or when bird shit falls on the forehead
 Third prize: Joao Vilhena, Bathtub # 211
 First Honorable Mention: João Eduardo de Vilhena, A mala matriz (If Matrix)
 First Honorable Mention: José Eduardo Marques Baptista, Screen Saver

Jury in 2008
 
 Baroness Ariane de Rothschild
 John Aiken (Slade School of Fine Art, London)
 The Moles Marc Bailly (Banque privée Edmond de Rothschild Europe)
 Adam Budak (Kunsthaus Manifesta 7 & Graz)
 Philippe Van Cauteren (SMAK, Ghent)
 Laura Hoptman (New Museum, New York)

External links
 Webpage Ariane de Rothschild Art Prize
 The Slade School of fine Art

Contemporary art awards
Awards established in 2003